The following is a list of presidents of the University of Virginia.

Presidents

See also
 University of Virginia

References

University of Virginia